Abdourahamane Soilihi (born 4 October 1959, in Mayotte) is a French politician who was elected to the French Senate on 25 September 2011, representing the department of Mayotte an overseas department and region of France.

References

Mayotte politicians
French Senators of the Fifth Republic
1959 births
Living people
People from Mayotte
Senators of Mayotte
21st-century French politicians